Nicole Delies is a Dutch former football striker. She played for Velocitas 1897, SV Saestum and CVV Oranje Nassau in the former Hoofdklasse, winning the championship and playing the UEFA Women's Cup with Saestum. She played briefly for SC Heerenveen in the new Eredivisie before retiring in 2008.

She was a member of the Dutch national team, making her debut on 20 September 2000 against Belarus and played a total of 41 matches, the last on 2 November 2006 against the United States.

International goals
Scores and results list the Netherlands goal tally first.

References

1980 births
Living people
Dutch women's footballers
Eredivisie (women) players
SC Heerenveen (women) players
Netherlands women's international footballers
People from Avereest
Women's association football forwards
SV Saestum players
Footballers from Overijssel